The 2010 Alabama Vipers season was the 10th season for the franchise, and the first under their current name, as well as the first in the Arena Football League. The team was coached by Dean Cokinos and played their home games at Von Braun Center. The Vipers failed to make the playoffs after posting a 7–9 record and finishing 5th in the American Conference.

Standings

Regular season schedule
The first game for the Vipers was on April 3 on the road against the Battle Wings. Their first home game will be a week later against the Sharks. Their final regular season game was at home in Week 18 against the Blaze on July 31.

All times are EDT

Roster

Regular season

Week 1: at Bossier–Shreveport Battle Wings

The Vipers lost their season opener in a close game. On the game's final play, needing a touchdown to tie, Alabama receiver Michael Johnson caught a pass, faked a lateral, and ran down the sideline. Having been tackled into the walls that border the sideline, he handed the ball to a teammate who ran into the end zone. The officials signaled a touchdown, but after a brief discussion amongst themselves, they overturned the original ruling because a player who is forced into the wall is considered out of bounds. Johnson was ruled down at the 5-yard line, but because there was no time remaining on the clock, the Vipers could not run another play, resulting in a 54–48 loss. Quarterback Kevin Eakin threw for 288 yards, but only 2 touchdowns. Dan Alexander had 5 touchdowns on 10 carries.

Week 2: vs. Jacksonville Sharks

After giving up the first touchdown on the 2nd half and at that point trailing by 14 points, the Vipers scored the game's next 5 touchdowns to take a 56–35 4th quarter lead. The 21 point cushion held, as the Vipers went on to win 63–49 for the team's first victory of the season. Dan Alexander led the team in rushing again, with 40 yards and 4 touchdowns. Quarterback Kevin Eakin threw for 244 yards and also had 4 touchdowns.

Week 3: at Utah Blaze

The game featured many lead changes and both teams matched touchdown for touchdown almost all night, but it was the Vipers who came out with the win, improving to 2–1 on the season. Leading by only 3 points at the start of the 4th quarter, Alabama's defense kept the Blaze out of the end zone until the game was all but over, while the offense was able to build a 17-point lead. Kevin Eakin threw for 375 yards and 5 touchdowns, and Larry Shipp led all receivers with 199 yards and 4 touchdowns. Dan Alexander rushed for 4 touchdowns in the win.

Week 4: Bye

Week 5: vs. Milwaukee Iron

The Vipers won their third straight game and handed the Iron their first loss of the season with a 75–67 win. It was back and forth all night, with Milwaukee leading at the half with a 7-yard passing touchdown with a few seconds left in a high scoring 2nd quarter. In the 3rd quarter, the Vipers took a 54–53 lead on a Brian Jackson field goal from 8 yards out. Their lead would carry into the 4th quarter, when Alabama took control of the game with a pair of touchdown passes by Kevin Eakin. Larry Shipp had a 48-yard rushing touchdown with just over a minute left. The Iron scored a touchdown with 39 seconds remaining to cut Alabama's lead to 8 points, but the Vipers recovered the ensuing onside kick and ran the clock out for the win. Eakin finished with 221 yards and 7 touchdowns. C.J. Johnson was the leading receiver with 91 yards and 3 touchdowns.

Week 6: at Tulsa Talons

The Vipers' 3-game winning streak was snapped after coming up short against the Talons. Alabama led at halftime 28–13, but by the end of the 3rd quarter, the game was tied 42–42. The Vipers did not score in the 4th quarter until there was less than a minute remaining. By that time, they had allowed two Tulsa touchdowns and a safety to fall behind 56–42 before Larry Shipp's 22-yard touchdown reception. Tulsa found the end zone again on their ensuing drive to make it a 14-point game again. Backup quarterback Tony Colston answered by running for a touchdown from 10 yards out. Now only down 62–56, the Vipers attempted an onside kick but did not recover it. The Talons took possession and ran out the clock for the win.

Starting quarterback Kevin Eakin threw for 281 yards and 3 touchdowns, but had to leave the game in the 4th quarter after suffering a sprained right ankle. Eakin had a similar injury in ArenaCup IX. Shipp's and Michael Johnson's receiving stats were almost identical. Shipp caught 8 passes for 119 yards and 2 touchdowns, while Johnson caught 8 passes for 120 yards and just a single touchdown.

Week 7: vs. Orlando Predators

Week 8: vs. Bossier–Shreveport Battle Wings

Week 9: at Oklahoma City Yard Dawgz

Week 10: at Iowa Barnstormers

Week 11: vs. Tampa Bay Storm

Week 12: vs. Dallas Vigilantes

Week 13: Bye

Week 14: at Jacksonville Sharks

Week 15: at Orlando Predators

Week 16: vs. Tulsa Talons

Week 17: at Tampa Bay Storm

Week 18: vs. Utah Blaze

References

Alabama Vipers
Alabama Vipers
2010 in sports in Alabama